is a 1947 black-and-white Japanese film directed by Kon Ichikawa, with special effects by Eiji Tsuburaya.

Plot 
Actress Yamane is chased by two suspicious men and escapes to the studio. As she escapes to the kimono, preview room, and stage, there are singing and dancing shows.

Cast 
 Hisako Yamane
 Susumu Fujita
Isuzu Yamada
Ranko Hanai
 Haruo Tanaka
 Yataro Kurokawa

References

External links 
 

Japanese black-and-white films
1947 films
Films directed by Kon Ichikawa
Films set in Tokyo
Toho films